William Young (7 May 1916 - 25 April 2013) was born in Ardrossan and was a Scotland international rugby union player. He later played for the representative East Africa multi-national side.

Rugby Union career

Amateur career

Young played rugby union for King's College Hospital before then playing for London Scottish.

Provincial career

He was supposed to play for the Scotland Probables in the first trial match of season 1937-38. The match due on 18 December 1937 was called off due to frost despite the contingency of straw being placed on The Greenyards pitch at Melrose. He did however turn out for the Scotland Probables side for the second and final trial match of that season, on 15 January 1938.

International career

Along with W.C.W. Murdoch, he was one of only two Scottish players to be capped on either side of World War II, giving him one of the longest international careers on record.

Medical career

He attended City of London School and studied medicine at St Catharine's College, Cambridge. and became a doctor after he finished playing rugby.

Family

Young was the son of Alexander Robert Young (born c1885 Govan, Lanarkshire Scotland) and Christina Leiper (born c1883 Lanark, Lanarkshire).

References

Sources
 Bath, Richard (ed.) The Scotland Rugby Miscellany (Vision Sports Publishing Ltd, 2007 )
 Jones, J.R. Encyclopedia of Rugby Union Football (Robert Hale, London, 1976 )
 Massie, Allan A Portrait of Scottish Rugby (Polygon, Edinburgh)

1916 births
2013 deaths
Alumni of St Catharine's College, Cambridge
Scottish rugby union players
Scotland international rugby union players
People educated at the City of London School
Scotland Probables players
London Scottish F.C. players
Rugby union number eights